opened in Nara, Japan, in 1992.

See also
 List of museums devoted to one photographer
 Nara National Museum
 Domon Ken Photography Museum
 Ogawa Seiyō

References

External links

  Irie Taikichi Memorial Museum of Photography Nara City

Museums in Nara, Nara
Photography museums and galleries in Japan
Kisho Kurokawa buildings
Museums established in 1992
1992 establishments in Japan